The following lists events that happened during 1981 in New Zealand.

Population
 Estimated population as of 31 December: 3,194,500
 Increase since 31 December 1980: 18,100 (0.57%)
 Males per 100 females: 98.7

Incumbents

Regal and viceregal
Head of State – Elizabeth II
Governor-General – The Hon Sir David Beattie GCMG GCVO QSO QC.

Government
The 39th New Zealand Parliament, led by the National Party, concluded, and in the general election the party was re-elected in the 40th New Zealand Parliament. Support for the government decreased, however, with the Labour Party receiving the largest portion of the popular vote.

Speaker of the House – Richard Harrison.
Prime Minister – Robert Muldoon
Deputy Prime Minister – Brian Talboys then Duncan MacIntyre.
Minister of Finance – Robert Muldoon.
Minister of Foreign Affairs – Brian Talboys then Warren Cooper.
Attorney-General – Jim McLay.
Chief Justice — Sir Ronald Davison

Parliamentary opposition
 Leader of the Opposition –  Bill Rowling (Labour).
Social Credit Party – Bruce Beetham

Main centre leaders
Mayor of Auckland – Colin Kay
Mayor of Hamilton – Ross Jansen
Mayor of Wellington – Michael Fowler
Mayor of Christchurch – Hamish Hay
Mayor of Dunedin – Clifford George (Cliff) Skeggs

Events
 January – Nambassa five-day celebration of music, crafts and alternative lifestyles culture on  farm at Waitawheta Valley between Waihi and Waikino. Attendance 20,000.
 January – The second Sweetwaters Music Festival is held near Ngāruawāhia.
 27 April – The Mahon Report into the crash of Air New Zealand Flight 901 is released, in which Justice Peter Mahon famously accuses Air New Zealand of telling "an orchestrated litany of lies".
 May – The first ATM in New Zealand was introduced in Wellington by the Northern Building Society.  
 July – Passports reintroduced for New Zealanders travelling to Australia. The Australian Royal Commission of Inquiry into Drugs says the exemption was exploited; travel had not required passports following the 1972 Trans-Tasman Travel Agreement.
 13 July – The South African rugby union team ("Springboks") arrives in New Zealand to begin the 1981 Springbok Tour
 25 July – 1981 Springbok Tour: The match between South Africa and Waikato at Rugby Park, Hamilton, is cancelled after 350 anti-apartheid protesters invade the pitch.
 13 September – The Springbok rugby team leave New Zealand.
 14 October – Christopher John Lewis attempts to assassinate Elizabeth II.
 The Kohanga reo scheme is established by the Department of Māori Affairs.
 The Food Act 1981 is passed into law.
 The Poor Knights Islands Marine Reserve is established

Arts and literature
William Sewell wins the Robert Burns Fellowship

See 1981 in art, 1981 in literature, :Category:1981 books

Music

New Zealand Music Awards 
Winners are shown first and in boldface with nominees underneath. 
ALBUM OF THE YEAR: Dave McArtney & The Pink Flamingos – Dave McArtney & The Pink Flamingos
 Dennis O'Brien – Still in the same Dream
 Hammond Gamble – Hammond Gamble Band
SINGLE OF THE YEAR: Coup D'État – Doctor, I Like Your Medicine
Blam Blam Blam – No Depression in New Zealand
 Screaming Meemees – See Me Go
TOP MALE VOCALIST: Dave McArtney (Dave McArtney & The Pink Flamingos)
Deane Waretinei
Hammond Gamble
TOP FEMALE VOCALIST: Suzanne Prentice
Jenny Morris
Tina Cross
TOP GROUP: Dave McArtney & The Pink Flamingos – Dave McArtney & The Pink Flamingos
Newmatics
Coup DE'tat
MOST PROMISING MALE VOCALIST: Dave McArtney
Paul Schreider
David Hollis
Richard Eriwata
MOST PROMISING FEMALE VOCALIST: Anne Dumont
Celine Toner
Jenny Morris
MOST PROMISING GROUP: The Screaming Meemees
Blam Blam Blam
Pop Mechanix
ENGINEER OF THE YEAR: Dave Hurley & Graham Myhre – Dave McArtney & the Pink Flamingos
Graham Myhre – Remember the Alamo
Gerry Smith – Still in the Same Dream
PRODUCER OF THE YEAR: Bruce Lynch – Dave McArtney and the Pink Flamingos
James Hall – Breaking in Another Day
James Hall – Still in the Same Dream
BEST COVER DESIGN: David Hollis – Caught Alive
Mark Clare – Broadcast O.R
Hal Chapman – Dave McArtney and the Pink Flamingos
SPECIAL AWARD: Fred Smith – Services to the Recording Industry (particularly with regard to Copyright)

See: 1981 in music

Performing arts

 Benny Award presented by the Variety Artists Club of New Zealand to Marcus Craig.

Radio and television
Feltex Television Awards:
Best Drama: Mortimer's Patch
Best Speciality: Sport on One – Sunday
Best Entertainment: Radio Times
Best Documentary: Moriori
Best Children's: Video Dispatch
Best Information: Country Calendar
Best Current Affairs: Close Up
Best Actor: Terence Cooper
Best Actress: Glynis McNicol
Best Script: Little Big Man Takes a Shot at the Moon
Best Television Entertainer: Hudson and Halls
Stan Hosgood Award for Allied Craft: Logan Brewer, Set designer for Hunters Gold, Gather Your Dreams, Children of Fire Mountain, I Pagliacci

See: 1981 in New Zealand television, 1981 in television, List of TVNZ television programming, :Category:Television in New Zealand, :Category:New Zealand television shows, Public broadcasting in New Zealand

Film
Pictures
Race for the Yankee Zephyr
Smash Palace
Wildcat
Dead Kids/Strange Behavior

See: :Category:1981 film awards, 1981 in film, List of New Zealand feature films, Cinema of New Zealand, :Category:1981 films

Sport

Athletics 
 Paul Ballinger wins his second national title in the men's marathon, clocking 2:17:28 on 2 May in Rotorua, while Christine Munro claims her first title in the women's championship (2:56:04).

Chess
 The 88th New Zealand Chess Championship is held in Christchurch. There is a three-way tie between Ewen McGowen Green, Ortvin Sarapu, and Vernon A. Small .

Cricket
1 February: Australian Trevor Chappell bowled an underarm delivery to batsman Brian McKechnie in a One-day International cricket match, the third of five matches in the final of the Benson & Hedges World Series Cup.

Horse racing

Harness racing
 New Zealand Trotting Cup: Armalight
 Auckland Trotting Cup: Delightful Lady – 2nd win

Rugby union 
 13 June: The All Blacks beat Scotland 11–4 at Carisbrook
 20 June: The All Blacks beat Scotland 40–15 at Eden Park
 15 August: The All Blacks beat South Africa 14–9 at Lancaster Park as part of the 1981 Springbok Tour
 29 August: The All Blacks lost 12–24 to South Africa at Athletic Park as part of the 1981 Springbok Tour
 12 September: The All Blacks beat South Africa 25–22 at Eden Park as part of the 1981 Springbok Tour
 24 October: The All Blacks beat Romania 14–6 in Bucharest
 14 November: The All Blacks beat France 13–9 in Toulouse
 21 November: The All Blacks beat France 18–6 in Paris
 The North vs South match is played in Dunedin and won by North, 10-4

Shooting
Ballinger Belt – Diane Blaymires (Te Puke)

Soccer
 The All Whites qualify for the 1982 Football World Cup
 New Zealand National Soccer League won by, Wellington Diamond United
 The Chatham Cup is won by Dunedin City who beat Mount Wellington 3–1 in the final.

Births
 5 January: Corey Flynn, rugby player.
 10 January: Hayden Roulston, professional cyclist.
 21 January: Jason Williams, rugby player.
 27 January: Tony Woodcock, rugby player.
 29 January: Jake Adams, musician.
 12 February: Daniel Braid, rugby player.
 21 February: Tainui Tukiwaho, Actor.
 6 March: Tim Brown, soccer player.
 20 March: Jamaal Lolesi, rugby league player.
 25 March: Mose Tuiali'i, rugby player.
 27 March: Sione Faumuina, rugby league player.
 30 April: Ali Williams, rugby player.
 4 May: Kate Elliott, actor.
 6 May: Jodi Te Huna, netball player.
 10 May: Lloyd Stephenson, field hockey player.
 19 May: Jamie How, cricketer.
 25 May: Shelley Paikea, singer.
 25 May: Matt Utai, rugby league player.
 25 May: Motu Tony, rugby league player.
 2 June: Brad Mika, rugby player.
 9 June: Dean Couzins, field hockey player.
 19 June: Moss Burmester, swimmer.
 28 June: Demetrius "Savage" Savelio, rapper.
 3 July: Tevita Latu, rugby league player.
 31 July: Paul Whatuira, rugby league player.
 31 July: Scott Talbot, swimmer and swimming coach.
 3 August: Daniel Koprivcic, soccer player.
 6 September: Te Atirau Paki, television presenter.
 22 September: James Stosic, rugby player.
 27 September: Brendon McCullum, cricketer.
 29 September (in Germany): Shane Smeltz, soccer player.
 29 October: Dwayne Cameron, actor
 29 October (in Sydney): Jamie Waugh, writer.
 24 November: Ian Butler, cricketer.
 10 December: Caleb Ross, actor.
 10 December: Conrad Smith, rugby player.
 20 December: Leo Bertos, soccer player.
:Category:1981 births

Deaths
 29 January: J. A. W. Bennett, literary scholar.
 23 March: Beatrice Tinsley, astronomer.
 21 December: Iriaka Rātana, politician.
 Keith Murray, architect and ceramic designer.

See also
List of years in New Zealand
Timeline of New Zealand history
History of New Zealand
Military history of New Zealand
Timeline of the New Zealand environment
Timeline of New Zealand's links with Antarctica

References

 
New Zealand
Years of the 20th century in New Zealand